Dysoptus sparsimaculatus is a species of moth in the family Arrhenophanidae. It is known only from three montane sites in northern Venezuela.

The length of the forewings is 4.6–5 mm for males. Adults are on wing in January, April and August.

Etymology
The specific name is derived from the Latin sparsus (few, rare) and maculata (spotted, marked), in reference to this species' almost immaculate wing pattern.

External links
Family Arrhenophanidae

Dysoptus
Taxa named by Donald R. Davis (entomologist)
Moths described in 2003